Paddy the Next Best Thing is a 1933 American pre-Code romantic comedy film directed by Harry Lachman and starring Janet Gaynor, Warner Baxter and Walter Connolly. The screenplay was written by Edwin J. Burke, based on the 1912 novel Paddy the Next Best Thing by Gertrude Page and its later stage adaptation, which had previously been made into a 1923 British silent film of the same title. The film reteamed Gaynor and Baxter who had starred together in the 1931 hit Daddy Long Legs.

Synopsis
Impoverished Irish landowner Major Adair pushes his eldest daughter Eileen to marry the wealthy Lawrence Blake in order to pay off his debts, despite the fact that she is in love with another man. However Adair's younger daughter Paddy falls for Blake herself, and schemes to order events to everybody's happiness.

Cast
 Janet Gaynor as Paddy Adair
 Warner Baxter as Lawrence Blake
 Walter Connolly as Major Adair
 Harvey Stephens as Jack Breen
 Margaret Lindsay as Eileen Adair
 J. M. Kerrigan as Collins
 Fiske O'Hara as Doctor David Adair
 Merle Tottenham as Maid
 Roger Imhof as Micky
 Mary McCormic as herself (scenes deleted)

Reception
The film was one of Fox's biggest hits of the year.

References

External links 
 

1933 films
1933 romantic comedy films
American black-and-white films
American romantic comedy films
American remakes of British films
Films based on adaptations
Films based on British novels
American films based on plays
Films directed by Harry Lachman
Films set in Ireland
Sound film remakes of silent films
Fox Film films
1930s English-language films
1930s American films
English-language romantic comedy films